

The Morane-Saulnier AR was a trainer aircraft produced in France during and after the First World War. Developed from the Morane-Saulnier LA reconnaissance aircraft, it was a wire-braced parasol-wing monoplane of conventional design with two open cockpits in tandem and cross-axle-style tailskid undercarriage. Construction was mostly of fabric-covered wood, but the forward fuselage was skinned in metal.

Large-scale production commenced after the Armistice, with the type now designated MS.35, in a number of subtypes differentiated principally in the engine used. Although Morane-Saulnier hoped to sell the type on the civil market as a touring machine, most of the 400 examples built saw service with the French Army, but others were used by the Navy and still others exported to foreign air arms. The MS.35s remained in service in France until 1929, after which time some were sold to the nation's flying clubs.

== Variants ==
 Type AR
 MS.35R - main production version with Le Rhône 9C engine
 MS.35A - version with Anzani engine
 MS.35C - version with Clerget 9C engine

Operators

 Aéronautique Militaire
 Écoles de pilotage
 Aéronautique Navale
 
 Argentine Air Force
 
Belgian Air Force
 
 Bolivian Air Force
 
 Brazilian Air Force
 
 Hellenic Air Force
 
 Guatemalan Air Force
 
 Paraguayan Air Force
 
 (70 examples)
 
 Royal Romanian Air Force
 
 Soviet Air Force - (60 examples)
 
 Swiss Air Force
 
 Turkish Air Force
 
 United States Navy
 
 Uruguayan Air Force

Specifications (MS.35R)

Notes

References

Further reading

1910s French military trainer aircraft
AR
Parasol-wing aircraft
Single-engined tractor aircraft
Aircraft first flown in 1915
Rotary-engined aircraft